Greshan Dananjaya is a Sri Lankan field athlete specializing in the Triple jump. He holds the current Sri Lankan record for the event with a jump of 16.71 m (-0.5 m/s) at the 2019 Sri Lankan National Trials in the Sugathadasa Stadium, Colombo. This passing the 2016 South Asian Games record of (16.45 M) Renjith Maheshwary of India.  He also holds Sri Lankan junior record in the long jump, with a jump of 7.83M.

Dananjaya is a product of Joseph Vaz College, and represent the Sri Lanka Army Sports Club locally.

References

Living people
1997 births
Sri Lankan athletes